Elsey may refer to:

Places

Australia

Northern Territory
Elsey, Northern Territory, a locality
Elsey National Park, a protected area
Elsey Station, a former pastoral lease
Electoral division of Elsey, a former electorate

Germany
Elsey Abbey, a former women's religious house

United States
Elsey, Missouri

People
Bill Elsey (1921–2019), British racehorse trainer
Charles Elsey (1882–1966), British racehorse trainer
George Elsey (1918-2015), US Naval Commander During World War 2

See also
Elseya